The Gunningbland Creek, a perennial river of the Lachlan subcatchment, part of the Murrumbidgee catchment of the Murray-Darling basin, is located in the Central West region of New South Wales, Australia.

Course and features
The creek descends  over its  course.

See also

 List of rivers of New South Wales (A-K)
 Rivers of New South Wales

References

External links
 

Tributaries of the Lachlan River
Rivers of New South Wales
Forbes Shire